Aleksandra Semenova (born 26 May 1998) is a Russian rhythmic gymnast.

Personal life 
Semenova began practicing rhythmic gymnastics at the age of 2, under the guidance of her mother (Victoria Tekel) and her grandmother. Aleksandra's father went missing when she was 6 years old. When Semenova was 10 years old, she and her mother moved to St. Petersburg. Until 2011, she trained at the Zhemchuzhina CHG, until 2013 at the Pushkin SDYUSSHOR

Career

Junior 
In 2010, Semenova took 10th place at the Russian Championship, thereby getting into the reserve national team of the Russian national team. In 2011, she took 1st place at the Youth of Russia competition. She then won gold her first international competitions "Petah Tikva Cup". Aleksandra was 12th in the Fifth Summer Spartakiad of students in Rostov-on-Don and 10th at the "Young Gymnasts" tournament in Kazan. Semenova ended up 1st at the "Hopes of St. Petersburg". She was 5th at the "Hopes of Russia" in Kazan.

In January 2012 Semenova at the «St.-Petersburg Championship» successfully reclaimed 1st place. At the Russian Championship in February she was only 20th, but she was noticed by Irina Viner, the head coach of the Russian national team and offered to perform at the 2012 Moscow Grand Prix outside the team competition with ball, Aleksandra scored 23,600 points, finishing in 67th place. During the Championship of Saint Petersburg she finished in 2nd, ahead of Diana Ibrahimov. Subsequently, Semenova sustained an injury to her right foot that was successfully treated.

In March 2013, Semenova won bronze at the open championship of St. Petersburg, ahead of Diana Ibragimova and Veronika Rudycheva. Aleksandra competed at the "Scarlet Sails" tournament in Saint-Petersburg taking silver behind Diana Ibrahimov.

In late 2013 Semenova entered the main Russian national team.

Senior 
In September 2013 Semenova was selected to integrate the Russian rhythmic gymnastics group. Her first competition as a member of the group was the Moscow Grand Prix in 2014, Russia won gold in the All-Around and event finals. At the Thiais Grand Prix, her team again won gold in all the events. They also won gold at the competition in Stuttgart. At the Grand Prix in Holon, they took second place in the All-Aound. In the first World Cup of the season in Tashkent, they won All-Around and 3 balls + 2 ribbons gold and 10 clubs' bronze.

Semenova then took part in the European Championships in Baku, where she helped the team in winning gold in the All-Around and also with 3 balls and 2 ribbons, and silver with 10 clubs. Then at Sofia's World Cup they won all the golds. In September, at the World Championships in Izmir, Russia was 4th in the All-Around, qualifying for one event final out of two, and won gold in the 3 balls + 2 ribbons final.

In 2015, Aleksandra was dropped out of the main Russian team. On September 6, 2015, she received the title of Honored Master of Sports of the Russian Federation.

References 

Living people
Russian rhythmic gymnasts
People from Veliky Novgorod
1998 births